Mircea Oaidă (born 20 February 1969) is a Romanian hurdler. He competed in the men's 110 metres hurdles at the 1992 Summer Olympics.

References

1969 births
Living people
Athletes (track and field) at the 1992 Summer Olympics
Romanian male hurdlers
Olympic athletes of Romania
Place of birth missing (living people)